Panjgrain was one of the 117 assembly constituencies of Punjab, an Indian state lying in Faridkot district. Panjgrain was also part of Faridkot Lok Sabha constituency.

Member of Legislative Assembly

See also
 Panjgrain
 Jalandhar district
 Jalandhar (Lok Sabha constituency)

References

External links
   

Jalandhar district
Former assembly constituencies of Punjab, India